Darnell Walker (born January 17, 1970) is a former cornerback in the National Football League (NFL). He played for the Atlanta Falcons, San Francisco 49ers, and Detroit Lions from 1993 to 2000.

Living people
1970 births
Players of American football from St. Louis
American football cornerbacks
Atlanta Falcons players
San Francisco 49ers players
Detroit Lions players
Oklahoma Sooners football players
Coffeyville Red Ravens football players